Achilles '29 Vrouwen is the women's section of Dutch football club Achilles '29 from Groesbeek, Netherlands.

The amateur team is called Achilles '29 Dames and pre-dates the professional team (Achilles '29 Vrouwen) which was established in 2015. The club has been competing in the Eredivisie for Women since the 2016–17 season.

Results Eredivisie

Current squad

Head coaches
 Judith Thijssen (2015–2017)
 Robert de Pauw (2017–2018)
 Marck Cieraad (2018–)

References

External links
 Official site 

Women
Women's football clubs in the Netherlands
Eredivisie (women) teams
2015 establishments in the Netherlands
Association football clubs established in 2015
Football clubs in Berg en Dal (municipality)